Achakanayuq (Quechua achakana (Neowerdermannia vorwerkii), a kind of cactus which an edible root, -yuq a suffix, "the one with the achakana plant", also spelled Achacanayoj) is a  mountain in the Andes of Bolivia. It is located in the Potosí Department, Nor Chichas Province, Cotagaita Municipality. Achakanayuq lies southeast of Quchayuq.

References 

Mountains of Potosí Department